Coullons is a commune in the Loiret department in north-central France.

See also
 Communes of the Loiret department

References

Communes of Loiret
Loiret communes articles needing translation from French Wikipedia